Charles Eames (Charles Eames, Jr) and Ray Eames (Ray-Bernice Eames) were an American married couple of industrial designers who made significant historical contributions to the development of modern architecture and furniture through the work of the Eames Office. They also worked in the fields of industrial and graphic design, fine art, and film. Charles was the public face of the Eames Office, but Ray and Charles worked together as creative partners and employed a diverse creative staff. Among their most recognized designs is the Eames Lounge Chair and the Eames Dining Chair.

Background
Charles Eames secured an architecture scholarship at Washington University, but his devotion to the practices of Frank Lloyd Wright caused issues with his tutors and he left after just two years of study.

He met Ray Gayber at Cranbrook Academy of Art in 1940. Charles arrived at the school on an industrial design fellowship as recommended by Eliel Saarinen, but soon became an instructor. Ray enrolled in various courses to expand upon her previous education in abstract painting in New York City under the guidance of Hans Hofmann. Charles entered into a furniture competition—with his “best friend” Eero Saarinen—hosted by the Museum of Modern Art. Eames and Saarinen's goal was to mold a single piece of plywood into a chair; the Organic Chair was born out of this attempt. The chair won first prize, but its form was unable to be successfully mass-produced. Eames and Saarinen considered it a failure, as the tooling for molding a chair from a single piece of wood had not yet been invented. Ray stepped in to help with the graphic design for their entry.
Eames divorced his first wife Catherine Woermann, and he and Ray married in June 1941. Their honeymoon was a road trip to relocate to Los Angeles.

Their first home, after staying in a hotel for a few weeks, was Neutra's Strathmore Apartments in the Westwood neighborhood. Charles and Ray began creating tooling and molding plywood into chairs in the second bedroom of the apartment, eventually finding more adequate work spaces in Venice.

The Eames Office 
The design office of Charles and Ray Eames functioned for more than four decades (1943–1988) in the former Bay Cities Garage at 901 Abbot Kinney Boulevard in Venice, Los Angeles, California.

The Eames' worked approximately 13-hour days, six or seven days a week, and directed the work of a team of collaborators. Through the years, its staff included many notable designers: Gregory Ain (who was Chief Engineer for the Eames' during World War II), Don Albinson, Harry Bertoia, Annette Del Zoppo, Peter Jon Pearce, and Deborah Sussman. 
The Eames' believed in "learning by doing"- before introducing a new idea at the Eames Office, Charles and Ray explored needs and constraints of the idea extensively.

Early Use of Plywood
In addition to their initial attempts in the molding of plywood into functional furniture, the Eames' developed a leg splint for wounded soldiers during WWII. This was in response to the war's medical officers in combat zones reporting the need for improved emergency transport splints. The Eames' created their splints from wood veneers, which they bonded together with a resin glue and shaped into compound curves using a process involving heat and pressure. With the introduction of plywood splints, they were able to replace problematic metal traction splints that had side effects of inducing gangrene due to impairment of blood circulation. The US navy's funding for the splints allowed Charles and Ray to begin experimenting more heavily with furniture designs and mass production.

Furniture design 

Eames products were manufactured on Washington Boulevard until the 1950s. Among the many important designs originating there are the molded-plywood DCW (Dining Chair Wood) and DCM (Dining Chair Metal with a plywood seat) (1945); Eames Lounge Chair (1956); the Aluminum Group furniture (1958); the Eames Chaise (1968), designed for Charles's friend and film director, Billy Wilder; the Solar Do-Nothing Machine (1957), an early solar energy experiment for the Aluminum Corporation of America; and a number of toys. Herman Miller officially relocated the tooling and resources for the mass production of Eames designs to its headquarters in Zeeland, Michigan in 1958. Herman Miller, along with their European counterpart Vitra, remain the only licensed manufacturers of Eames furnitures and products.
As with their earlier molded plywood work, the Eames' pioneered technologies, such as using fiberglass as a materials for mass-produced furniture. From the beginning, the Eames furniture has usually been listed as by Charles Eames. In the 1948 and 1952 Herman Miller bound catalogs, only Charles' name is listed, but it has become clear that Ray was deeply involved and was an equal partner with her husband in many projects. Charles was consistently advocating that Ray was his equal. In August 2005, Maharam fabrics reissued Eames designed fabrics; Sea Things (1947) pattern and Dot Pattern. Dot Pattern was conceived for The Museum of Modern Art's “Competition for Printed Fabrics” in 1947. The Eames fabrics were designed solely by Ray. In 1979, the Royal Institute of British Architects awarded Charles and Ray with the Royal Gold Medal.  At the time of Charles' death they were working on what became their last production, the Eames Sofa, which went into production thanks to Ray's efforts in 1984.

Films 
Charles and Ray channeled their separate interest in photography and theatre into the production of 125 short films. From their first film, the unfinished Traveling Boy (1950), to the most-recognized Powers of Ten (re-released in 1977), to their last film in 1982, their cinematic work was an outlet for ideas, a vehicle for experimentation and education.  The couple often produced short films to document their interests, such as collecting toys and cultural artifacts on their travels. The films also record the process of hanging their exhibits or producing classic furniture designs.  One film, Blacktop, filmed soap suds and water moving over the pavement of a parking lot, a normally mundane subject turned visually poetic. Powers of Ten (narrated by physicist Philip Morrison) gives a dramatic demonstration of orders of magnitude by visually zooming away from the earth to the edge of the universe, and then microscopically zooming into the nucleus of a carbon atom. The "Powers of Ten shot" has been referenced by Hollywood as a praised filming technique.

Architecture 
Charles attended Washington University from 1936 to 1938 and was expelled from the architecture program due to his loyalty to the practices of Frank Lloyd Wright. He constructed two churches in Arkansas and three homes in St. Louis without an architecture license. He relocated to Michigan to attend the Cranbrook Academy of Art.

Three years after arriving in Los Angeles, Charles and Ray were asked to participate in the Case Study House Program, a housing program sponsored by Arts & Architecture magazine in the hopes of showcasing examples of economically-priced modern homes that utilized wartime and industrial materials. John Entenza, the owner and editor of Arts & Architecture magazine, recognized the importance of Charles and Ray's thinking and design practices—alongside becoming a close friend of the couple. Charles and Eero Saarinen were hired to design Case Study House number 8, which would be the residence of Charles and Ray, and Case Study House number 9, which would house John Entenza, in 1945. The two homes (alongside other Case Study houses) would share a five-acre parcel of land in the Pacific Palisades neighborhood north of Santa Monica, which overlooked the Pacific Ocean. Because of post-war material rationing, the materials ordered for the first draft of the Eames House (called “the Bridge House”) were backordered. Charles and Ray spent many days and nights on-site in the meadow picnicking, shooting arrows, and socializing with family, friends, and coworkers. They learned of their love for the eucalyptus grove, the expanse of land, and the unobstructed view of the ocean. They made the decision to not build the Bridge House and instead reconfigured the materials to create two separate structures nestled into the property's hillside. Eero Saarinen had no part in this second draft of the Eames House; it was a full collaboration between Charles and Ray. The materials were finally delivered and the house was erected from February through December 1949. The Eames' moved in on Christmas Eve and it became their only residence for the remainder of their lives. It remains a milestone of modern architecture.

The Eames Office designed a few more pieces of architecture, many of which were never put into fruition. The Herman Miller Showroom on Beverly Boulevard in Los Angeles was built in 1950 and the De Pree House was constructed in Zeeland, Michigan for Max De Pree, son of the founder of Herman Miller, and his growing family. Unbuilt projects include the Billy Wilder House, the prefabricated kit home known as the Kwikset House, and a national aquarium.

Exhibition design 
The Eames' also conceived and designed a number of exhibitions. The first of these, Mathematica: A World of Numbers... and Beyond (1961), was sponsored by IBM, and is the only Eames exhibition still in existence. The Mathematica exhibition is still considered a model for science popularization exhibitions. It was followed by A Computer Perspective: Background to the Computer Age (1971) and The World of Franklin and Jefferson (1975–1977), among others.

List of works

Architecture 
 Sweetzer House, 1931 (Charles only)
St. Mary's Church, Helena, Arkansas, 1934 (Charles only)
St. Mary's Catholic Church, Paragould, Arkansas, 1935 (Charles only)
Meyer House, Huntleigh, Missouri, 1936-1938 (Charles only)
 Dinsmoor House, 1936 (Charles only)
Dean House, 1936 (Charles only)
 City Hall, 1944 (unbuilt, for Architectural Forum magazine competition)
Bridge House, 1945 (Charles and Eero Sarrinen, unbuilt)
Jefferson National Expansion Memorial Competition, 1947 (St. Louis Gateway Arch by Eero Saarinen won the competition)
 Eames House, Case Study House 8, Pacific Palisades, California, 1949
Entenza House, Case Study House 9, Pacific Palisades, California, 1950
 Billy Wilder House, Beverly Hills, California, 1950 (unbuilt)
 Herman Miller Showroom, Los Angeles, California, 1950
 Kwikset House, 1951 (unbuilt)
 Max and Esther De Pree House, Zeeland, Michigan, 1954
 Griffith Park Railroad, Los Angeles, California, 1957
Revell Toy House, 1959 (unbuilt)
The Time-Life Building Lobby, 1961
National Fisheries Center and Aquarium, Washington D.C., 1967 (unbuilt)

Films (selected)

 Traveling Boy (1950)
Blacktop: A Story of the Washing of a School Play Yard (1952)
Parade Parade Or Here They Are Coming Down Our Street (1952)
Circus (1953)
A Communications Primer (1953)[13]
House: After Five Years of Living (1955)
Day of the Dead (1957)
Toccata for Toy Trains (1957)
The Information Machine (1957)[14]
Solar Do-Nothing Machine (1957)
 India (1958)
Glimpses of the USA (1959)
An Introduction to Feedback (1959)
Kaleidoscope Jazz Chair (1960)
Tivoli Slide Show (1961)
Furniture: Beautiful Details (1961)
IBM Mathematics Peep Show (1961), short documentary based on Mathematica: A World of Numbers... and Beyond exhibit by Eames
House of Science (1962)
IBM Fair Presentation Film #2 (1963)
THINK (1964)
Herman Miller International Slideshow (1967)
G.E.M. Slide Show (1967)
Picasso Slide Show (1967)
National Fisheries Center and Aquarium (1967)
 A Computer Glossary (1968)
Babbage’s Calculating Machine or Difference Engine (1968)
Tops (1969)
Image of the City (1969)[15]
Soft Pad (1970)
Circus Slide Show (1970)
Louvre Slide Show (1970)
Cemeteries Slide Show (1970)
Tim Gad Slide Show (1971)
 Goods Slide Show (1971)
Baptistery Slide Show (1971)
Computer Perspective (1972)
Alpha (1972)
SX-70, promotional announcement/documentary of the Polaroid Corporation SX-70 instant camera
Banana Leaf (1972)
Design Q&A (1972)
Copernicus (1973)
Atlas: A Sketch of the Rise and Fall of the Roman Empire (1976)
Powers of Ten (1968, rereleased in 1977)
Goods (1981)

Furniture 

Kleinhans Music Hall Chair (1939–40) Charles Eames, Eero Saarinen, Eliel Saarinen.
Conversation Armchair (1940) Charles Eames & Eero Saarinen.
Side Chair (1940) Charles Eames & Eero Saarinen.
Molded Plywood Pilot's Seat (1943) 
Prototype Plywood and Metal Chairs (various models) (1943-1946) 
Molded Plywood Elephant (1945) 
Lounge Chair Wood or LCW (1945-1946) 
Lounge Chair Metal or LCM (1945-1946) 
Dining Chair Wood or DCW (1945-1946) 
Dining Chair Metal or DCM (1945-1946) 
Molded Plywood Folding Screen (1945-1946) 
Molded Plywood Coffee Table wood or metal legs (1945-1946) 
"Donstrosity" prototype lounge (1946) 
Prototype Plywood Lounge with metal base (1946) 
Prototype Stamped Metal Chairs (1948) 
LaChaise prototype (1948) 
Molded Plastic & Fiberglass Armchair Shell various bases (1948-1950) 
Wire Mesh Side Chair or DKR (1951) 
Hang-It-All (1953) 
670 & 671 or Eames Lounge & Ottoman (1956) 
Leisure Group (later Aluminum Group): High Back Lounge, Low Back Lounge, Dining Side Chair (1958) 
Eames Chaise (1968)

Exhibition design

 Textiles and Ornamental Arts of India (1955)
 Glimpses of the USA (seven screens for the American exhibition in Moscow, Sokoolniki Park, 1959)
 Mathematica: A World of Numbers... and Beyond (IBM, 1961)
 IBM Pavilion at the 1964/1965 New York World's Fair
 Nehru: The man and his India (1965)
 The World of Franklin and Jefferson (1975) built for the US Bicentennial Commission, opened in Paris, traveled to five other countries and the US.

Other 

 Zenith 6D030 Z radio (1946)
 Emerson 578A radio (1946)
 Emerson 588A radio (1946)
The Toy (1951)
House Of Cards (1952)
 The Coloring Toy (1955)
 Stephens Speaker (1956)

Deaths 
Charles died on August 21, 1978, while visiting St. Louis. Ray survived exactly another decade, passing away on August 21, 1988, in Santa Monica, California.

Charles's daughter, Lucia Eames, inherited the Eames collections and Eames House. Although Charles did not concern himself with the future of their designs after their death, Ray was actively planning the continuation of the Eames legacy during the last decade of her life. She founded the Eames Foundation in 2004 to preserve and share the legacy of the Eames House with the public for future generations. Lucia Eames died in 2014, leaving her five children as the Board of Directors of the Eames Office and Eames Foundation. The Eames Office continues its work in educating and advocating for the legacy of the Eames', which includes occasionally releasing previously un-produced Eames designs.

Awards and recognition
 On June 17, 2008, the US Postal Service released the Eames postage stamps, a pane of 16 stamps celebrating the designs of Charles and Ray Eames.
 AIA Twenty-five Year Award, 1978
 Royal Gold Medal, 1979
 "The Most Influential Designer of the 20th Century" IDSA 1985
ADC Hall of Fame, Charles Eames inducted in 1984, Ray Eames inducted in 2008
First National Industrial Designers Institute Award, 1951
First Annual Kaufmann International Design Award, 1960
Museum of Science & Industry, Chicago, Illinois  Special Award, 1967
United States Information Agency, Outstanding Service Award, 1976
American Institute of Graphic Arts, Medalist Award, 1977
Art Center College of Design, 50th Anniversary Award for Distinguished Lifetime Achievement, 1980

Contemporary exhibitions and retrospectives

 Charles and Ray Eames at the Design Museum (1998)
Library of Congress exhibit (1999)
A documentary about the couple titled Eames: The Architect and the Painter was released on November 18, 2011, as part of the American Masters series on PBS television.
The World of Charles and Ray Eames Barbican Art Gallery, October 21, 2015 – February 14, 2016.
Eames & Hollywood, Art & Design Atomium Museum, March 10, 2016 – September 4, 2016.
The World of Charles and Ray Eames Oakland Museum of California, October 13, 2018 – February 17, 2019

See also 

 National Institute of Design, Ahmedabad 
 The India Report

References

Bibliography
Butler, Cornelia and Alexandra Schwartz eds. Modern Women: Women Artists at the Museum of Modern Art, 220–224. New York : Museum of Modern Art,  2010.
Caplan, Ralph, "Connections: The Work of Charles and Ray Eames". Los Angeles: UCLA, 1976.
Rago, David and John Sollo. Collecting Modern: a guide to mid-century furniture and collectibles. Gibbs Smith, 2001.
Drexler, Arthur. "Charles Eames Furniture from the Design Collection of Modern Art, New York". New York: Museum of Modern Art, 1973
 Neuhart, Marilyn, Neuhart, John and Eames, Ray. Eames Design: The Work of the Office of Charles and Ray Eames. Abrahms, New York 1989.
 Eisenbrand, Jochen. Ray Eames. Breuer, Gerda, Meer, Julia (ed): Women in Graphic Design, p. 152–163 and 437. Jovis, Berlin 2012.
 Kirkham, Pat. Charles and Ray Eames: Designers of the 21st Century. MIT Press, Boston 1998.
 Brandes, Uta Brandes. Citizen Office: Ideen und Notizen zu einer neuen Bürowelt. von Vegesack, Alexander (ed) Steidl Verlag, Goettingen 1994.
 Kunkel, Ulrike. Ray Eames: Design als Lebensform. Jürgs, Britta (ed) Vom Salzstreuer bis zum Automobil: Designerinnen, p. 126-139, AvivA Verlag, Berlin 2002. (de., eng.)
 Eames, Charles and Eames, Ray. Die Welt von Charles und Ray Eames. Ernst & Sohn, Berlin 1997.
 Prouvé, Jean. Charles & Ray Eames. Die großen Konstrukteure – Parallelen und Unterschiede. Vitra Design Museum, Weil am Rhein 2002. (de., frz., engl.).
Demetrios, Eames. An Eames Primer. New York: Universe, 2002.
Gössel, Peter (ed.) Koenig Gloria. Eames. Taschen, 2005.
Albrecht, Donald. The work of Charles and Ray Eames: A Legacy of Invention. Harry N. Abrams in association with the Library of Congress and the Vitra Design Museum, 2005.
 
 Kugler, Jolanthe. "Eames Furniture Sourcebook" Weil am Rhein, Germany Vitra Design Museum 2017

External links

 A Virtual Encyclopedia of All Things Eames
The Library of Congress Website for The Work of Charles & Ray Eames
Eames Foundation
Museum of Modern Art website
The Metropolitan Museum of Art Heilbrunn Timeline of Art History Page on Charles & Ray Eames
Art Directors Club biography, portrait and images of work
California Museum Hall of Fame

"A Communications Primer"(1953) at the Internet Archive
Charles Eames talks with Studs Terkel, October 1, 1965; on WFMT, from The Chicago History Museum, at the Internet Archive
"Growing Up Eames" on Architectural Digest
"Explore the World of Design Icons Charles and Ray Eames" on Architectural Digest
"Charles and Ray Eames" by Esther Mccoy in Design Quarterly 1995
"Charles and Ray Eames in India" by Saloni Marthur in Art Journal 2011
"War Furniture: Charles and Ray Eames Design for the Wounded Body" by Jason Weems in BOOM 2012

Modernist architects from the United States
Modernist designers
American furniture designers
American industrial designers
California people in design
Architects from Los Angeles
Architects of Roman Catholic churches
Cranbrook Academy of Art alumni
Married couples
AIGA medalists
Recipients of the Royal Gold Medal
Burials at Calvary Cemetery (St. Louis)
20th-century American architects
Business duos